The Stranger Returns (Italian: Un uomo, un cavallo, una pistola, lit. A Man, a Horse, a Gun) also known as Shoot First... Laugh Last!, is a 1967 Italian-German-American Spaghetti Western film directed by Luigi Vanzi. It is a sequel to A Stranger in Town.

The film is the second in a series of four western films starring Tony Anthony as "The Stranger".

Cast 
 Tony Anthony - The Stranger
 Dan Vadis - En Plein
 Daniele Vargas - Good Jim
 Marco Guglielmi - The Preacher
 Jill Banner - Caroline
 Marina Berti - Ethel
 Raf Baldassarre - Chrysler
 Mario Novelli (as Anthony Freeman): Austin
 Renato Mambor: Alvarez
 Ettore Manni: Lieutenant George Stafford
 Mario Dionisi: El Plein Henchman
 Fred Coplan: El Plein Henchman

Reception

Paul Mavis, of DVDTalk, reviewing the Warner Archive Collection 2015 DVD release of The Stranger Collection, wrote, "While they're not in the league of Leone (what is?), Anthony's grimy, sneaky little punk killer is an intriguing addition to the genre.  Tony Anthony did some very interesting things with the spaghetti Western genre, including, perhaps, presaging the Trinity movies, while certainly "inventing" the West-meets-East subgenre."

References

External links

1967 films
1960s Italian-language films
English-language Italian films
Spaghetti Western films
Films scored by Stelvio Cipriani
1967 Western (genre) films
Metro-Goldwyn-Mayer films
1960s Italian films